"Lifetime to Love" is a 2000 song by the musician CeCe Peniston. The title was originally recorded for a 4 Play Records compilation Circuit Sessions 00.1, which featured overall thirteen dance/house remixes by L.A. DJ Manny Lehman (including also for example Junior Vasquez's "Be Quiet", Pat Hodges' "Rushin to Meet You", Michelle Weeks' "Rejoice", or Trancesetters' "Roaches").

In January 2001, "Lifetime to Love" was released on single, returning the artist to the top positions of the U.S. Billboard Hot Dance Music/Club Play chart, where the composition peaked at number two eventually, becoming the second most successful track taken from both compilations (after the US Dance No.1 single, "If It Don't Fit" by Abigail, respectively "Don't You Want My Love" by Debbie Jacobs-Rock, taken from the Vol. 2 compilation).

Credits and personnel
 CeCe Peniston – lead/back vocal, 
 Steven Nikolas – writer, mix, producer
 Brendon Sibley – writer, mix, producer
 Ralphi Rosario – remix, additional producer
 Abel Aguilera – remix, additional producer
 Nic Torriero – remix, additional producer
 Rob Milo – remix, additional producer
 DJ Justin Time – remix, additional producer
 Dave Audé – remix, additional producer
 Jeff Haddad – executive producer
 Randy Sills – executive producer
 David Brant CMYK – photography
 J.A.G. – graphic design
 EMI Music/Steven & Brendon Songs (ASCAP) – publisher

Track listings and formats

 12", US, #4P 2030-1
 "Lifetime to Love" (Mr. Nice Guy 2 Step Mix) - 5:56
 "Lifetime to Love" (Nic Torriero & Rob Milo Dub) - 7:42

 12", US, #4P 2029-1
 "Lifetime to Love" (Nikolas & Sibley Extended Mix) - 8:10
 "Lifetime to Love" (Justin Time Dub) - 7:31
 "Lifetime to Love" (Rosabel Attitude Vox) - 7:28
 "Lifetime to Love" (Rosabel Data Flash Dub) - 7:58

 12", US, TP, #4P 2029-1 & 4P 2030-1
 "Lifetime to Love" (Mr. Nice Guy 2 Step Mix) - 5:56
 "Lifetime to Love" (Nic Torriero & Rob Milo Dub) - 7:42
 "Lifetime to Love" (Nikolas & Sibley Extended Mix) - 8:10
 "Lifetime to Love" (Justin Time Dub) - 7:31
 "Lifetime to Love" (Rosabel Attitude Vox) - 7:28
 "Lifetime to Love" (Rosabel Data Flash Dub) - 7:58

 MCD, CA & US, #FP 82029-2
 "Lifetime to Love" (Radio Edit) - 3:45
 "Lifetime to Love" (Nikolas & Sibley Extended Mix) - 8:10
 "Lifetime to Love" (Rosabel Attitude Vox) - 7:28
 "Lifetime to Love" (Rosabel Data Flash Dub) - 7:58
 "Lifetime to Love" (Nic Torriero & Rob Milo Dub) - 7:42
 "Lifetime to Love" (Justin Time Dub) - 7:31
 "Lifetime to Love" (Mr. Nice Guy 2 Step Mix) - 5:56

Charts

Weekly charts

Year-end charts

References

General

 Specific

External links 
 

2001 singles
CeCe Peniston songs
2000 songs